Appling is a census-designated place in and the county seat of Columbia County, Georgia, United States. As of the 2020 census, its population is 658. It is part of the Augusta metropolitan area.

Appling was formerly a city but, with the 1993 passage of legislation requiring cities to provide at least three municipal services, Appling was not able to remain incorporated. It was one of 187 inactive cities in Georgia that lost its charter on 1 June 1995.  There was question as to whether it had ever been incorporated at all since it had no functioning corporate authorities.

Columbia County government and judicial offices are in Evans with the Columbia County Government Center, the Government Complex Addition, and the Columbia County Courthouse Annex all located there.  Appling retains its status as county seat but all governmental functions are carried out in Evans.

Geography

Appling lies along U.S. Route 221 (Appling-Harlem Road) and is traversed by (Great) Kiokee Creek.

Demographics

2020 census

As of the 2020 United States census, there were 658 people, 311 households, and 145 families residing in the CDP.

2000 census
The following information applies to the ZIP Code Tabulation Area (ZCTA) for ZIP Code 30802, which is centered immediately south of Appling.

As of the census of 2000, there were 5,177 people, 1,745 households, and 1,387 families residing in the ZCTA.  There were 1,745 housing units in the ZCTA. The racial makeup of the ZCTA was 76.0% White, 21.5% African American, 0.6% Native American, 0.6% Asian, 0.1% Pacific Islander, 0.5% from other races, and 0.8% from two or more races. Hispanic or Latino of any race were 1.1% of the population.

There were 1,745 households, out of which 37.7% had children under the age of 18 living with them, 64.4% were married couples living together, 11.3% had a female householder with no husband present, and 20.5% were non-families. 16.8% of all households were made up of individuals, and 5.9% had someone living alone who was 65 years of age or older. The average household size was 2.83 and the average family size was 3.20.

In the ZCTA the population was spread out, with 26.6% under the age of 18, 7.5% from 18 to 24, 29.8% from 25 to 44, 24.4% from 45 to 64, and 11.7% who were 65 years of age or older. The median age was 37.3 years. For every 100 females, there were 98.0 males. For every 100 females age 18 and over, there were 94.7 males.

The median income for a household in the ZCTA was $40,467, and the median income for a family was $53,207. Males had a median income of $38,929 versus $21,700 for females. The per capita income for the ZCTA was $20,893. About 4.9% of families and 5.5% of the population were below the poverty line, including 6.5% of those under age 18 and 13.1% of those age 65 or over.

History

Appling was known as Columbia Courthouse when it received its original town charter in 1816. The town was renamed for local resident Colonel Daniel Appling, a decorated soldier in the War of 1812, after he died in 1817.

In the early 19th century, Appling was the political, educational, social, and religious center of Columbia County and home to nearby schools Carmel Academy and Columbia Institute. Carmel Academy was founded by the famous Southern educator Moses Waddel and attended by John C. Calhoun and William H. Crawford. Columbia Institute was founded by Connecticut-born David Bushnell, inventor of the first naval wartime submarine, who moved to the area after serving in the American Revolutionary War.

In the 1830s, when the Georgia Railroad was established, it was decided that having a train pass through Appling would disturb the proceedings of the court, so the railway from Atlanta to Augusta was built to the south of Appling.

In 1855, the courthouse in Appling received a major overhaul, and after the remodeling was complete in 1856, the building was in more or less its present form, a vernacular structure with Greek Revival and Italianate influences. Despite the extensive project, the shell of the 1809-1812 building was retained and the structure has been listed on the National Register of Historic Places since 1980.

Appling was nearly destroyed by a tornado in the 1870s, and it never regained the prestige it had prior to the tornado and the Civil War. Although there was an effort to organize the municipality in the early 20th century, the corporation remained inactive. Appling lost its charter in 1995.

See also

Central Savannah River Area
Professional Disc Golf Association
Lake Strom Thurmond

Notes

Census-designated places in Columbia County, Georgia
County seats in Georgia (U.S. state)
Former municipalities in Georgia (U.S. state)
Populated places disestablished in 1995
Augusta metropolitan area